The Khan Yunis Governorate is one of 16 Governorates of Palestine, located in the southern Gaza Strip. Its district capital is Khan Yunis. The governorate has a total population of approximately 280,000. Its land area is 69.61% urban, 12.8% rural and 17.57% comprising the Khan Yunis refugee camp.

Localities

Cities
Abasan al-Kabera
Bani Suheila
Khan Yunis

Municipalities
Abasan al-Saghira
Khuza'a
al-Qarara

Village councils
al-Fukhari
Qa' al-Kharaba
Qa' al-Qurein
Qizan an-Najjar
Umm Kameil
Umm al-Kilab

References

External links

 
Governorates of the Palestinian National Authority in the Gaza Strip